Gastown is the original settlement that became the core of the city of Vancouver, British Columbia, Canada, and a national historic site and a neighbourhood in the northwest section of the Downtown Eastside, adjacent to Downtown Vancouver.

Its historical boundaries – the waterfront (now Water Street and the CPR tracks), Carrall Street, Hastings Street, and Cambie Street – followed the borders of the 1870 townsite survey, the proper name and postal address of which was Granville, B.I. ("Burrard Inlet"). The official boundary does not include most of Hastings Street except for the Woodward's and Dominion Buildings, and stretches east past Columbia Street, to the laneway running parallel to the west side of Main Street.

History 

Gastown was Vancouver's first neighbourhood and was named for "Gassy" Jack Deighton, a Yorkshire seaman, steamboat captain and barkeep who arrived in 1867 to open the area's first saloon. He was famous for his habit of talking at length (or "gassing") and the area around his saloon came to be known as "Gassy's town," a nickname that evolved to "Gastown." The town soon prospered as the site of Hastings Mill sawmill, seaport, and quickly became a general centre of trade and commerce on Burrard Inlet as well as a rough-and-rowdy resort for off-work loggers and fishermen as well as the crews and captains of the many sailing ships which came to Gastown or Moodyville, on the north side of the inlet (which was a dry town) to load logs and timber.

In the 1960s, citizens became concerned with preserving Gastown's distinctive and historic architecture, which like the nearby Chinatown and Strathcona was scheduled to be demolished to build a major freeway into the city's downtown. A campaign led by businesspeople and property owners, as well as the counterculture and associated political protestors gained traction to save Gastown. Henk F. Vanderhorst, a Dutch immigrant to Canadian citizen, opened the 'Exposition Gallery', an art gallery on Water Street which started, flourished and encouraged a flow of other fledgling business startups to boom in the Gastown core. His influence with the revitalization of Gastown was acknowledged in 1976 by being awarded 'The First Pioneer Citizen of Gastown' award by Mayor Art Phillips. "A key to the city". Vanderhorst's efforts, in part, pressured the civic, provincial and federal governments to declare Gastown a historical site, protecting its heritage buildings to this day.

Gastown was designated a National Historic Site of Canada in 2009.

21st century

Gastown is a mix of "hip" contemporary fashion and interior furnishing boutiques, tourist-oriented businesses (generally restricted to Water Street), restaurants, nightclubs, poverty and newly upscale housing.  In addition, there are law firms, architects and other professional offices, as well as computer and internet businesses, art galleries, music and art studios, tattoo parlours, and acting and film schools.

In February 2013, The Gastown Gazette began publishing local news and stories about the ongoing protests against gentrification in the Downtown Eastside and Gastown area of Vancouver. The community paper has since gathered provincial and national attention for reports on the neighbourhood.

Gastown has become a hub for technology and new media. It has attracted companies such as Zaui Software, Idea Rebel, MetroQuest, BootUp Labs Entrepreneurial Society, SEOinVancouver and MarketR.

Popular annual events that take place on the cobblestone streets of Gastown include the Vancouver International Jazz Festival and the Global Relay Gastown Grand Prix international bicycle race.

In June 2004, Storyeum opened in Gastown. It was a lively theatrical 65-minute show that re-enacted the history of BC using eight sets that were all located below street level. Unfortunately, due to mounting debt, the attraction closed its doors in October 2006.

The Gassy Jack statue was toppled on February 14, 2022, by protesters during the 31st annual Memorial March for Missing and Murdered Indigenous Women and Girls.

Gastown steam clock

Gastown's most famous (though nowhere near oldest) landmark is the steam-powered clock on the corner of Cambie and Water Street. It was built in 1977 to cover a steam grate, part of Vancouver's distributed steam heating system, as a way to harness the steam and to prevent street people from sleeping on the spot in cold weather. Its original design was faulty and it had to be powered by electricity after a breakdown. The steam mechanism was completely restored with the financial support of local businesses as it had become a major tourist attraction, and is promoted as a heritage feature although it is of modern invention.

The steam used is low pressure downtown-wide steam heating network (from a plant adjacent to the Georgia Viaduct) that powers a miniature steam engine in its base, in turn driving a chain lift. The chain lift moves steel balls upward, where they are unloaded and roll to a descending chain. The weight of the balls on the descending chain drives a conventional pendulum clock escapement, geared to the hands on the four faces. The steam also powers the clock's sound production, with whistles being used instead of bells to produce the Westminster "chime" and to signal the time.

In October 2014, the clock was temporarily removed for major repairs by its original builder, and was reinstalled January 2015.

References

External links

 Official Gastown Community Website
 Gastown at Virtual Vancouver 
 Global Relay Gastown Grand Prix
 Club Zone.com "Gastown Bars" page
 The Gastown Gazette, community newspaper
 Gastown page, Vancouver Then and Now website, comparisons of old photos with modern locations

Archival photos
 View of Gastown from offshore, 1884, prior to announcement of CPR terminus
 View of Gastown from offshore, 1886
 View of Alexander Street, Gastown c.1911
 View of Water Street from jct. Cordova Street, c.1890
 View of Water Street from Maple Tree Square, 1887 (Sunnyside Hotel at right)
 View of Cordova Street from above intersection of Carrall; July 1, 1890 Dominion Day celebrations
 View of Cordova Street from above intersection of Cambie; c.1900 when this was still the city's principal shopping district

National Historic Sites in British Columbia
Neighbourhoods in Vancouver
Historic districts in Canada
Tourist attractions in Vancouver
History of Vancouver